Ravenswood is a railroad station on the North Side of Chicago serving Metra's Union Pacific North Line. It is located at 4800 North Ravenswood Avenue, just south of West Lawrence Avenue. A previous Ravenswood station was located at Wilson Avenue, but was replaced with the station at the current location, opposite the Chicago and North Western Railway's Ravenswood Accounting Office & Carload Tracing Bureau, which were housed in a building at 4801 North Ravenswood Avenue. In Metra's zone-based fare system, Ravenswood is in zone B. As of 2018, Ravenswood is the third busiest of Metra's 236 non-downtown stations, with an average of 2,630 weekday boardings. Ravenswood station is near the eastern edge of the Chicago neighborhood also known as Ravenswood and the western edge of Uptown.

The station consists of two side platforms, and does not contain a ticket agent booth. Northbound trains stop on the west platform and southbound trains stop on the east platform. Trains go south to Ogilvie Transportation Center and as far north as Kenosha, Wisconsin. It is the busiest station on the UP North Line and will be rebuilt starting in the fall of 2010 as part of a project that includes replacing 12 bridges along this line. The new station was expected to be completed by May 2014, but construction is still ongoing.

As of April 25, 2022, Ravenswood is served by all 35 trains in each direction on weekdays, by 12 of 13 trains in each direction on Saturdays, and by all nine trains in each direction on Sundays.  During the summer concert season, the extra weekend train to  also stops here.

Bus and rail connections

CTA Brown Line 
Damen

CTA
  81 Lawrence (Owl Service)

References

External links

Metra - Ravenswood station
Lawrence Avenue entrance from Google Maps Street View

Metra stations in Chicago
Former Chicago and North Western Railway stations
Union Pacific North Line